The Range Feud  is a 1931 American Pre-Code Western film directed by D. Ross Lederman for Columbia Pictures, that stars Buck Jones and John Wayne.  Wayne biographer Ronald L. Davis referred to the film as the first in a collection of "cheap, assembly-line pictures" Wayne would make in the 1930s. It was remade in 1934 as a 15-chapter Buck Jones serial called The Red Rider (without Wayne).

Plot
Clint Turner is arrested for the murder of his girlfriend Judy Walton's father. Clint falls under suspicion because the dead man was a rival rancher who had been an enemy of Clint's father years before. It is Sheriff Gordon's job to sort the whole thing out.

Cast
 Buck Jones as Sheriff Buck Gordon
 John Wayne as Clint Turner
 Susan Fleming as Judy Walton
 Edward LeSaint as John Walton
 Will Walling as Dad Turner
 Wallace MacDonald as Hank
 Harry Woods as Vandall
 Frank Austin as Jed Biggers
 Jack Curtis as bartender Charlie (uncredited)
 Glenn Strange as cowhand Slim (uncredited)
 Al Taylor as cowhand Al (uncredited)
 Blackjack Ward as Deputy Jack (uncredited)

See also
 John Wayne filmography

References

External links

 
 
 

1931 films
1931 Western (genre) films
American Western (genre) films
American black-and-white films
1930s English-language films
Columbia Pictures films
Films directed by D. Ross Lederman
1930s American films